The Decision is the 18th book in the Animorphs series, written by K.A. Applegate. It is narrated by Ax.

The inside front cover quote is, "Ax is about to bug out...." The front cover quote is, "Change a little. Change a lot. Just change...."

Plot summary
Thanks to intel from their friend and ally, Erek the Chee, the Animorphs discover that a high-ranking member of the Secret Service, Hewlett Aldershot III, has been intentionally injured by the Yeerks and is being kept secretly in a hospital where he is heavily guarded. Since he cannot be infested while in a coma, Visser Three acquires his DNA in hopes of impersonating him to eventually acquire an even more senior official. However, he figures out that the Animorphs are spying on him in seagull morphs, so he morphs a kafit bird from the Andalite home world and gives chase to Ax, Rachel, and Marco, whom he spies at the time.  Eventually, he settles on only chasing Ax, and after cornering him on the roof of a McDonald's, they engage in tail-to-tail combat in their Andalite bodies.  Surprisingly, Ax defeats the older Andalite under Visser Three's control, and he forces him to retreat, which gives himself time to escape.

The next day, while meeting in Cassie's family's barn, the team decides to morph mosquitoes with the theory that they can acquire Aldershot by sucking his blood without being in their natural forms, where the Yeerk guards might notice them.  However, while in mosquito morph, they are transported to Z-Space when their extra mass is caught in the slipstream of an Andalite ship, the Ascalin, heading for the planet Leera, where there is a Yeerk invasion underway. Just before they suffocate, they are rescued and taken aboard.

Once on the ship, Ax begins to subconsciously, unintentionally ignore the Animorphs, instead following orders from the captain, largely due to how much he missed being around other Andalites.  The humans are told to stay calmly in a room while the Andalites do all the work. Unfortunately, the captain of the ship, Captain Samilin-Corrath-Gahar, reveals himself to be a traitor. He incapacitates the other Andalites on the bridge, stunning most and amputating the tail blade of the tactical officer, Harelin-Frodlin-Sirinial.  Ax is held, unharmed, as a hostage and an offering to Visser Four, who is overseeing the Yeerk invasion on Leera and is the best friend of Visser Three.  Ax calls out to the Animorphs for help, but they reveal to Ax that they are already present in the room.  Cassie and Ax distract Captain Samilin long enough for Tactical Officer Harelin to kill him.  As the ship is about to be taken by the Yeerks, Harelin instructs them to leave while he initiates the self-destruct sequence, which kills him and every other Andalite aboard the ship.

After the Animorphs escape from the self-destructed Ascalin, emotions are running high, mainly surrounding Ax.  While Jake, Tobias, and Cassie are more understanding of Ax's temporary transference of loyalties to the Andalites during their time on the ship, Rachel and Marco are incredibly angry and annoyed at his decision and repeatedly browbeat him for it (despite Tobias attempting to make them stop), with Rachel even pushing Ax far enough to put his tail blade at her throat for her comments.  But after Jake calms the tension down, Ax apologizes to his friends for his treatment of them and reaffirms his loyalty to Jake.  Then, they focus on finding a way back to Earth.

The Animorphs head across the major landmass of Leera to try to find friendly Andalites. In the midst of the war going on, Tobias suddenly and mysteriously disappears, but the others don't know where he's gone and are forced to move on without him.  Ax is struck with a sudden realization about where to find some friendly Andalites, and the Animorphs follow him out into the ocean. Rachel disappears like Tobias, and the others rescue a group of Leerans from Yeerk control. The Leerans agree to be acquired in order to help fight off the Yeerk invasion. In their new Leeran morphs, the Animorphs enter a Leeran city. The Andalites based there inform the Animorphs that they have planted a bomb to explode the continent, just as Ax had suspected, but that it needs to be activated. Just as the Animorphs volunteer for the mission, Marco disappears, causing a panic among Ax, Jake, and Cassie.  After explaining their problem to the Andalites, the Andalite scientists theorize that the Animorphs' unexplained disappearances are the result of a "snapback" effect, meaning that when the Animorphs disappear, they are reappearing either on Earth or in Z-Space, the latter possibility causing fear among Ax, Jake, and Cassie.

Soon after they set out to activate the bomb, they meet a Leeran-Controller who reads their minds and alerts the Yeerks of the bomb. After dealing with the Leeran, Cassie disappears.  When they reach the explosives, Jake disappears, leaving Ax alone. He activates the bomb, but a platoon of armed Hork-Bajir appear in an attempt to disarm it. A Hork-Bajir fires at him, but he disappears right before the beam hits him. The bomb goes off right after he disappears.  All the Animorphs arrive back in the hospital, where they were before they got sucked into Z-Space, and despite being pulled away from Leera at different times, they realize that they have all arrived back at Earth at exactly the same moment that they were pulled into Z-space.  In addition, Hewlett Aldershot III wakes up, apparently healthy again, foiling the Yeerks' scheme and leaving the Animorphs' plans to acquire him officially unnecessary.

The Animorphs celebrate their victory at the food court, and Ax silently realizes that the Animorphs are the true people that he must follow, especially in light of Captain Samilin's treachery.  Glad to get back to normal with them, he is ready for his favorite snack: cinnamon buns.

Morphs

Trivia
This book marks the first time that Animorphs have faced a non-Yeerk-controlled Andalite villain.  The same would not happen again until the introduction of Arbat in The Arrival.

Animorphs books
1998 American novels
Fiction portraying humans as aliens
Novels set on fictional planets
1998 science fiction novels